Jerimy Creek is a  long 1st order tributary to Lawsons Creek in Halifax County, Virginia.

Course 
Jerimy Creek rises about 1 mile southeast of Cedar Grove, Virginia, and then flows generally north and to join Lawsons Creek about 3 miles northeast of Danripple.

Watershed 
Jerimy Creek drains  of area, receives about 45.7 in/year of precipitation, has a wetness index of 403.47, and is about 37% forested.

See also 
 List of Virginia Rivers

References

Watershed Maps 

Rivers of Virginia
Rivers of Halifax County, Virginia
Tributaries of the Roanoke River